The Emporia State University Teachers College is an education college located in Emporia, Kansas, United States. It is a part of Emporia State University.

History
The university was established in 1863 as Kansas State Normal School. A university history gives 1907 as the first date teacher training was organized as a department.

Since then, The Teachers College has been through a few name changes:

 1907-1929: Department of Pedagogy; 
 1929-1969: Department of Education; 
 1969-1983: School of Education and Psychology; 
 1983-1988: College of Education; 
 1988–present: The Teachers College

Departments & Services
 Counselor Education (art therapy, mental health counseling, rehabilitation counseling, rehabilitation services education, school counseling)
 Elementary Education/Early Childhood/Special Education
 Health, Physical Education, and Recreation (athletic training, health education, health promotion, physical education, recreation, coaching education)
 Instructional Design & Technology
 Jones Institute for Educational Excellence
 Kansas Masonic Literacy Center
 Office of Field Placement & Licensure
 Psychology (experimental psychology concentration, industrial organizational psychology concentration, clinical psychology, school psychology)
 School Leadership / Middle & Secondary Teacher Education

Art Therapy program
The Art Therapy program was created in 1973 by Robert Ault, and is one of the oldest in the country. The degree program is two years long and, the completion of the program earns students a Master’s of Science in Art Therapy Counseling. The program provides students with the necessary training to work with diverse populations through the creative process. Emporia State University’s program is accredited by the Accreditation Council for Allied Health Professionals/Accreditation Council for Art Therapy Education (CAAHEP/ACATE) as well as the National Association of Schools of Art and Design (NASAD). Students who are pursuing a degree in Art Therapy are invited to apply for dual Curricula culminates in students earning the Master of Science in Art Therapy Counseling AND the Master of Science in Clinical Counseling or Master of Science in Clinical Psychology. Earning both degrees grants student’s eligibility to become licensed by the Kansas Behavioral Science Regulatory Board.

Three instructors educate students in the Art Therapy Department: Gaelynn Wolf Bordonaro PhD., ATR-BC, ATCS, Libby Schmanke MS, ATR-BC, LCAC, ATCS, and Clara Corn, MS, ATR. In 2020, Wolf Bordonaro was named a Roe R. Cross Distinguished Professor, the university's highest honor. She served four terms on the Board of Directors for the American Art Therapy Association, and the Art Therapy Credentials Board, and is the Clinical Director of Communities Healing through Art (CHART). Schmanke is the author of Art Therapy and Substance Abuse: Enabling Recovery from Alcohol and Other Drug Addiction, and has also served on the Art Therapy Credentials Board.

Each spring, since 1974 the Art Therapy program hosts the Art Therapy Discovery Day Conference. The conference is open for registration to the public and includes an annual keynote speaker as well as breakout sessions, presentations highlight contemporary topics in the field of art therapy, a silent auction, and a lunch program. A variety of individuals attend the conference including current students, professional art therapists, counselors, therapists, social workers, and psychologists.

National Teachers Hall of Fame

The National Teachers Hall of Fame (NTHF) is a non-profit organization that honors exceptional school teachers. The NTHF was established in 1989 by a consortium of organizations including  Emporia State, the Alumni Association of the school, the City of Emporia, Emporia Public Schools, as well as the Emporia Area Chamber of Commerce. The NTHF has a museum on Emporia State's campus that honors the teachers inducted. Every June, the Hall of Fame inducts five of the most outstanding educators in the United States.

Memorial for Fallen Educators
On June 13, 2013, the NTHF executive director Carol Strickland, along with former ESU President Michael Shonrock, Bill Maness, representing U.S. Sen. Jerry Moran, and former mayor Rob Gilligan, broke ground by the one-room school house located on the Emporia State campus to build a memorial for the teachers that have fallen in the "line of duty". The Sandy Hook Elementary School shooting was the main inspiration for the memorial. On June 6, 2014, the granite memorial markers were placed along with granite benches. The official dedication was on June 12, 2014.

On September 21, 2015, United States Senator Jerry Moran introduced a bill to the United States Congress to designate the memorial as the "National Memorial to Fallen Educators". Since the bill was passed by both the United States House of Representatives and Senate, the memorial was signed by the President of the United States, and the memorial did not become a part of the National Park Service nor are federal funds used.

Accolades and rankings
The Teachers College at Emporia State University is one of only four post-secondary institutions in the nationalong with Alverno College, Stanford University, and University of Virginiato be identified as an Exemplary Model Teacher Education program by Arthur Levine in his 2006 national study of teacher education programs Educating School Teachers.

See also
 Kansas State Department of Education
 United States Department of Education

References

External links
 

Emporia State University
1863 establishments in Kansas